The even–odd rule is an algorithm implemented in vector-based graphic software, like the PostScript language and Scalable Vector Graphics (SVG), which determines how a graphical shape with more than one closed outline will be filled. Unlike the nonzero-rule algorithm, this algorithm will alternatively color and leave uncolored shapes defined by nested closed paths irrespective of their winding.

The SVG defines the even–odd rule by saying:

The rule can be seen in effect in many vector graphic programs (such as Freehand or Illustrator), where a crossing of an outline with itself causes shapes to fill in strange ways.

On a simple curve, the even–odd rule reduces to a decision algorithm for the point in polygon problem.

The SVG computer graphics vector standard may be configured to use the even–odd rule when drawing polygons, though it uses the non-zero rule by default.

Implementation 
Below is an example implementation in Python:
def is_point_in_path(x: int, y: int, poly) -> bool:
    # Determine if the point is in the polygon.
    #
    # Args:
    #   x -- The x coordinates of point.
    #   y -- The y coordinates of point.
    #   poly -- a list of tuples [(x, y), (x, y), ...]
    #
    # Returns:
    #   True if the point is in the path or is a corner or on the boundary
     
        num = len(poly)
        j = num - 1
        c = False
        for i in range(num):
            if (x == poly[i][0]) and (y == poly[i][1]):
                # point is a corner
                return True
            if ((poly[i][1] > y) != (poly[j][1] > y)):
                slope = (x-poly[i][0])*(poly[j][1]-poly[i][1])-(poly[j][0]-poly[i][0])*(y-poly[i][1])
                if slope == 0:
                    # point is on boundary
                    return True
                if (slope < 0) != (poly[j][1] < poly[i][1]):
                    c = not c
            j = i
        return c

See also

Nonzero-rule
Jordan curve theorem
Complex polygon
Tessellation
Polygon triangulation
TrueType

References

External links
 Definition of fill rules in SVG

Computer graphics algorithms
Parity (mathematics)